Francis Edward McLaughlin (June 19, 1856 – April 5, 1917) was an infielder for Major League Baseball in the 19th century.

Sources

Frank McLaughlin stats
The Baseball Nexus

1856 births
1917 deaths
Baseball players from Massachusetts
Major League Baseball shortstops
Worcester Ruby Legs players
Pittsburgh Alleghenys players
Cincinnati Outlaw Reds players
Chicago Browns/Pittsburgh Stogies players
Kansas City Cowboys (UA) players
Sportspeople from Lowell, Massachusetts
19th-century baseball players
Johnstown (minor league baseball) players
Fort Wayne Hoosiers players
Birmingham (minor league baseball) players
Memphis Reds players
Boston Blues players
Lowell Magicians players
Dallas Hams players
San Antonio Missionaries players
San Antonio Cowboys players
Wilmington Blue Hens players
Lynn (minor league baseball) players
American people of Irish descent